Rubicks are an Electronic alt-pop band from London. Consisting of Vanessa Anne Redd (vocals/guitar), Marc Makarov (bass), Anthony Johns (drums) and Vee Vimolmal (synths).

History 

The band have achieved critical acclaim for their releases over the years including 2006’s ‘In Miniature’ album and  2009 ‘Idiot Time’ EP, released on Sharp Attack Records.

Their track 'Midas' has appeared on Rough Trade Shops 'Best of Counter Culture' LP (V2)  and 'I See You' Modular DJs 'Leave Them All Behind' (Modular Records) compilations.

'Idiot Time' and 'Giddy Up' were used for film advertising campaigns for Valentino the Italian Fashion Label.

Rubicks have toured across Europe, North America and the UK including performances at SXSW in Austin TX, Canadian Music Week in Toronto and headlined Tundra Festival in Lithuania. They have supported Gary Numan, John Foxx, White Rose Movement, The Klaxons, She Wants Revenge,  on various UK and European tours.

Discography 

Albums
 In Miniature (LP) Sharp Attack Records 2006 (Distributed by Universal Records)
 The bands' second LP ‘Rise and Fall of the Giddy’ was released in summer 2011.

Singles and EPs
 Midas (single) Balloon Records 2002
 I See You (single) Sharp Attack Records 2004 (Distributed by Universal Records)
 Midas (single) Sharp Attack Records 2006 (Distributed by Universal Records)
 Idiot Time (EP) Sharp Attack Records 2009 
 Giddy Up (single) Sharp Attack Records 2010
 Is This Love (single) Sharp Attack Records 2010
 Worship (single) Sharp Attack Records 2010

External links 
 Official Site
 

Musical groups from London